DroidKungFu is a malware that affects Android OS. It primarily targets users in China. The first evidence of this malware was found in the Android Market in March 2011.

History
DroidKungFu was discovered by US-based researchers Yajin Zhou and Xuxian Jiang. The two discovered this malware while working at North Carolina State University. It targets the Android 2.2 platform and allows hackers to access and control devices. DroidKungFu malware can collect some user data through backdoor hacking.

Process of DroidKungFu malware
DroidkungFu encrypts two different root exploits: a udev exploit and a "RageAgainsTheCage" exploit, to break android security.  Once executed, it decrypts the exploits and communicates with a remote server without user knowledge.

Function 

 Silent mobile device rooting
 Unlocks all system files and functions 
 Installs itself without any user interaction

Data collected 

 IMEI number 
 Phone model
 Android OS version
 Network operator
 Network type
 Information stored in the Phone & SD Card memory

See also
 Botnet
 Command and control (malware)
 Denial-of-service attack
 File binder
 Shedun
 Trojan horse
 Zombie (computer science)
 Zeus (malware)

References

Android (operating system) malware
Denial-of-service attacks
Mobile malware